The 2020 San Marino and Rimini Riviera motorcycle Grand Prix (officially known as the Gran Premio Lenovo di San Marino e della Riviera di Rimini) was the seventh round of the 2020 Grand Prix motorcycle racing season and the sixth round of the 2020 MotoGP World Championship. It was held at the Misano World Circuit Marco Simoncelli in Misano Adriatico on 13 September 2020.

Background

Impact of the COVID-19 pandemic
The opening rounds of the 2020 championship were heavily affected by the COVID-19 pandemic. Several Grands Prix were cancelled or postponed after the aborted opening round in Qatar, prompting the Fédération Internationale de Motocyclisme to draft a new calendar. However, the San Marino and Rimini Riviera Grand Prix was not impacted by this change and kept its original date.

MotoGP Championship standings before the race 
After the sixth round at the 2020 Styrian Grand Prix, Fabio Quartararo on 70 points, lead the championship by 3 points over Andrea Dovizioso with Jack Miller a further 14 points behind.

In the Teams' Championship, Petronas Yamaha SRT with 102 points, lead the championship from Monster Energy Yamaha with 93. Ducati Team sat one point behind the factory Yamaha in third, and 8 points ahead of fourth-placed KTM Factory Racing with 84 points, while Team Suzuki Ecstar sat 5th on 73 points.

MotoGP Entrants 

 Stefan Bradl replaced Marc Márquez from the Czech Republic round onwards while he recovered from injuries sustained in his opening round crash.

Free practice 
The first practice session ended with Maverick Viñales fastest for Monster Energy Yamaha MotoGP ahead of Petronas Yamaha SRT's Fabio Quartararo and Aprilia Racing Team Gresini's Aleix Espargaró. The second practice session ended with Quartararo fastest, followed by Franco Morbidelli and Pol Espargaró.

Combined Free Practice 1-2-3 
The top ten riders (written in bold) qualified in Q2.

Free Practice 4 
The first three positions of the session were as follows.

Qualifying

MotoGP

Race

MotoGP

Moto2

 Remy Gardner was declared unfit to start the race with hand & foot fractures suffered in a crash during Sunday warm-up.

Moto3

MotoE

All bikes manufactured by Energica.

Championship standings after the race
Below are the standings for the top five riders, constructors, and teams after the round.

MotoGP

Riders' Championship standings

Constructors' Championship standings

Teams' Championship standings

Moto2

Riders' Championship standings

Constructors' Championship standings

Teams' Championship standings

Moto3

Riders' Championship standings

Constructors' Championship standings

Teams' Championship standings

MotoE

Notes

References

External links

San Marino
San Marino Motorcycle Grand Prix
San Marino and Rimini Riviera motorcycle Grand Prix
San Marino motorcycle Grand Prix